James Arthur Monk (born December 5, 1957) is an American former professional football player who was a wide receiver in the National Football League (NFL) for the Washington Redskins, New York Jets, and the Philadelphia Eagles. He is considered by many NFL players, coaches and analysts to be one of the greatest wide receivers of all time. Monk was inducted into the Pro Football Hall of Fame in 2008.

Personal life
He is a relative (first cousin once removed) of jazz pioneer Thelonious Monk.

College career
Monk attended and played college football at Syracuse University, where he was a four-year Orangemen letter winner (1976–79).  He led the team in receiving in 1977, 1978 and 1979 and still ranks in the top 10 on several school career record lists, including career receptions (sixth), all-time receiving yards (seventh) and receiving yards per game (ninth).  While there, Monk was a graduate of the College of Visual and Performing Arts.

College statistics

* Includes bowl games.

Professional career
Monk was drafted in the first round of the 1980 NFL Draft by the Washington Redskins.  During his rookie year, he was a unanimous All-Rookie selection and had 58 receptions, which was a Redskins' rookie record.

In 1984, Monk caught a then-NFL record 106 receptions for a career-best 1,372 yards. He caught eight or more passes in six games, had five games of 100 yards or more, and in a game against the San Francisco 49ers caught ten passes for 200 yards.  That season, he earned team MVP honors and his first Pro Bowl selection. Monk went over the 1,000-yard mark in each of the following two seasons, becoming the first Redskins receiver to produce three consecutive 1,000-yard seasons.  He also became the first Redskins player to catch 70 or more passes in three consecutive seasons.  In 1989, he was part of a prolific wide receiver trio (along with Gary Clark and Ricky Sanders) nicknamed "The Posse," who became the first trio of wide receivers in NFL history to post 1,000-plus yards in the same season.

During Monk's 14 seasons with the Redskins, the team won three Super Bowls (XVII, XXII, and XXVI) and had only three losing seasons.  He was an All-Pro and All-NFC choice in 1984 and 1985 and was named second-team All-NFC in 1986.  He was also selected to play in the Pro Bowl following the 1984, 1985 and 1986 seasons.

Nine times during his 15-season career with the Redskins, New York Jets, and Philadelphia Eagles, Monk exceeded 50 catches in a season and five times gained more than 1,000 receiving yards. His record for most receptions in a season (106 in 1984) stood until broken by Sterling Sharpe's 108 in 1992. He also set the record for career receptions when he caught his 820th in a Monday Night game against Denver on October 12, 1992. He became the first player to eclipse 900 receptions, and pushed the record up to 940 before being overtaken by Jerry Rice in the final week of his last season (1995). With the retirement of James Lofton in 1993, he was the NFL's active leader in career receptions  for just two weeks in 1994 before being passed by Jerry Rice. He retired with the most consecutive games with a catch (183).  He was named to the NFL 1980s All-Decade Team.  Monk also became the first player in the league to record a touchdown reception in 15 consecutive seasons, as well as the first player ever to record at least 35 receptions in 15 consecutive seasons.  Through the course of his 14 years with the Redskins, Monk converted nearly two-thirds of his 888 catches into first downs.

On August 2, 2008, Monk, along with fellow Washington Redskins teammate Darrell Green, was inducted into the Pro Football Hall of Fame. Upon his induction into the Hall of Fame, Monk received the longest standing ovation in Pro Football Hall of Fame history, lasting four minutes and four seconds when later timed by NFL Films. In 2012, Monk was inducted into the College Football Hall of Fame.

Statistics
Career Statistics
 Total Games Played: 224
 Total Receptions: 940
 Total Reception Yards: 12,721
 Total Regular Season Touchdowns: 68
 Total Playoff Touchdowns: 8
 1,000-yard seasons: 5
 50+ Reception Seasons: 9
 100+ yard regular season games: 33
 150+ yard regular season games: 7
 200+ yard regular season games: 2
 100+ yard playoff games: 5

Seasons among the league's top 10
 Receptions: 1984 - 1st, 1985 - 2nd, 1988 - 9th (tied), 1989 - 3rd (tied)
 Receiving yards: 1984 - 4th, 1985 - 3rd, 1989 - 10th
 Receiving TDs: 1991 - 9th (tied)

Among the league's all-time top 20
 Receptions: 10th (940)
 Receiving yards: 14th (12,721)
 Consecutive games with at least one reception: 6th (183); trails Jerry Rice (274), Tony Gonzalez (194), Marvin Harrison (190), Hines Ward (186), Terrell Owens (185)

Redskins records
 Yards from scrimmage (13,053)
 Receiving yards (12,026)
 Receptions (888)
 Consecutive games with at least one reception (164) These are his consecutive games with a catch as a Redskin, not for his career. Monk continued his streak after moving on from the team.

NFL Records
 First player to record a touchdown reception in 15 consecutive seasons (1980-1994)
 Consecutive seasons with at least 35 receptions (15, 1980–1994)
 First player to record over 102+ receptions (106 in 1984 season) in a season before NFL rules changes prior to the 1990 season that ushered in the "pass happy era".  Still, only three players in the next nine years collected 100 passes or more and only one (Sterling Sharpe in 1992 season) surpassed his total.
 First player to record over 100+ receptions in the Super Bowl era
 First player to record back to back seasons with 1,200 yards and 90 receptions (1984, 1985)
 First player to reach 820 receptions in a career
 First player to surpass 900 career receptions, finishing career with 940 (all-time record at the time)
 First player to record at least one reception in 180 consecutive games

Awards
 1980 Unanimous All Rookie Team Selection
 1984 - Pro Football Weekly: 1st team all-Pro
 1984 - UPI: 1st team all-conf.
 1984 - Associated Press: 1st team all-NFL
 1984 - Pro Football Writers: 1st team
 1984 - Newspaper Ent. Assoc.: 2nd team
 1984 - Pro Football Weekly: 1st team all-NFL
 1984 - Sporting News: 1st team all-NFL
 1985 - UPI: 1st team all-conf.
 1985 - Associated Press: 2nd team all-NFL
 1985 - Sporting News: 1st team all-NFL
 1986 - UPI: 2nd team all-conf.

After football

Business
Monk is executive and co-founder of Alliant Merchant Services, an electronic payment services company located in Northern Virginia.

Community service
A devout Christian, Monk helped found the Good Samaritan Foundation with his Washington teammates Charles Mann, Tim Johnson and Earnest Byner.  The foundation provides youth with the environment needed to equip them with the skills, training and resources necessary to compete successfully in society through the Student Training Opportunity Program (STOP).  The program serves more than 50 high school students four days a week during the school year and five days a week during the summer providing after-school programs, tutoring and mentoring.

Founded in 1983, the Art Monk Football Camp has graduated over 14,000 athletes.

Honors
 Elected to Syracuse University Board of Trustees
 NFL 1980s All-Decade Team Member
 2008 - Pro Football Hall of Fame Inductee
 2012 - College Football Hall of Fame Inductee
 2015 - WPHS Sports Hall of Fame Inductee

References

External links

 

1957 births
Living people
American football wide receivers
New York Jets players
Philadelphia Eagles players
Syracuse Orange football players
Washington Redskins players
College Football Hall of Fame inductees
National Conference Pro Bowl players
Pro Football Hall of Fame inductees
People from White Plains, New York
Sportspeople from Westchester County, New York
Players of American football from New York (state)
African-American players of American football
White Plains High School alumni
21st-century African-American people
20th-century African-American sportspeople
10,000 receiving yards club
Ed Block Courage Award recipients